Title 41 of the Code of Federal Regulations ("CFR"), titled Public Contracts and Property Management, is the portion of the CFR that governs federal government public contracts within the United States. It is available in digital or printed form.

Title 41 comprises four volumes, and is divided into six Subtitles. Only three of the Subtitles are currently in use, the others being either obsolesced (Subtitle A) or reserved for future use (Subtitles D and E).

Subtitle A: Federal Procurement Regulations System
Subtitle A, which previously covered the Federal Procurement Regulations System, was replaced in 1983 by the Federal Acquisition Regulation now set out in Title 48 of the Code of Federal Regulations.

Subtitle B: Other Provisions Relating to Public Contracts
Subtitle B is titled Other Provisions Relating to Public Contracts. It comprises Chapters 50, 51, 60 and 61, and occupies substantially all of Volume 1.

Subtitle C: Federal Property Management Regulations System
Subtitle C is titled Federal Property Management Regulations System. It comprises Chapters 101, 105, 109, 114, 115 and 128, and occupies all of Volume 2 and substantially all of Volume 3.

Subtitle D: Other Provisions Relating to Property Management
Subtitle D is not in use and is reserved for other provisions relating to property management.

Subtitle E: Federal Information Resources Management Regulations System
Subtitle E is not in use and is reserved for provisions relating to the Federal Information Resources Management Regulations System.

Subtitle F: Federal Travel Regulation System
Subtitle F is titled Federal Travel Regulation System. It comprises Chapters 300 through 304 and occupies substantially all of Volume 4.

References

External links
 Title 41 of the Code of Federal Regulations
 Individual volumes:
41 C.F.R., Volume 1 (2012)
41 C.F.R., Volume 2 (2012)
41 C.F.R., Volume 3 (2012)
41 C.F.R., Volume 4 (2012)

 41
Government procurement in the United States